Pleurotomella ursula is a species of sea snail, a marine gastropod mollusk in the family Raphitomidae.

Description

Distribution
This marine species occurs off the Agulhas Bank, South Africa

References

External links
  Barnard K.H. (1958), Contribution to the knowledge of South African marine Mollusca. Part 1. Gastropoda; Prosobranchiata: Toxoglossa; Annals of the South African Museum. Annale van die Suid-Afrikaanse Museum; vol. 44 (1958)
 Thiele J., 1925. Gastropoden der Deutschen Tiefsee-Expedition. In:. Wissenschaftliche Ergebnisse der Deutschen Tiefsee-Expedition auf dem Dampfer "Valdivia" 1898–1899 II. Teil, vol. 17, No. 2, Gustav Fischer, Berlin
 

Endemic fauna of South Africa
ursula
Gastropods described in 1925